Chamaeothrips is a genus of thrips in the family Phlaeothripidae.

Species
 Chamaeothrips decoratus
 Chamaeothrips jucundus

References

Phlaeothripidae
Thrips
Thrips genera